Michael Richard Sefi LVO (born 11 December 1943) is a British philatelist and was the Keeper of the Royal Philatelic Collection from 1 January 2003.

Life 
Sefi was born in London. When he was a child, his grandfather introduced him to stamp collecting. He began collecting stamps again in his early thirties when his own children received stamps and stamp albums as a gift and while he was looking for a hobby to ease the stress from the Mann Judd and Touche Ross merger. He specialized in collecting the first postage stamps of George V's reign.

He worked as a chartered accountant until he partially retired in 1983. He was a partner of Mann Judd, later Touche Ross, [later Deloitte] in the 1970s. He became an active member of the Great Britain Philatelic Society of which he was president between 2000/02 and 2012/14. Sefi was a member of Council of the Royal Philatelic Society London between 1990 and 2005 where he was a member of many decision-making bodies.

In September 1996, he was hired as deputy to the Keeper of the Royal Philatelic Collection, who was Charles Goodwyn. He helped him accelerate the mounting of the George VI postage stamp collection. Sefi participated in international philatelic exhibitions of parts of the Royal Philatelic Collection and in welcoming students and researchers. He played a major role in the move of the collection from Buckingham Palace to St James's Palace in 1999.

When Charles Goodwyn announced his retirement in late 2002, Sefi was chosen to succeed him among three other candidates by the Keeper of the Privy Purse.

He retired as Keeper of the Royal Philatelic Collection in September 2018.

He directed the preparations of The Queen's Own, a Royal Collection exhibit at the National Postal Museum in Washington, D.C., which was held in 2004.
To assist Sefi, he had the help of Surésh Dhargalkar, an architect and conservation specialist, who was Sefi's assistant from 2003. 
To help him for the mounting, he hired George VI specialist, Rod Vousden, as assistant.

Honours
 Sefi was appointed Lieutenant of the Royal Victorian Order (LVO) in the 2013 Queen's Birthday Honours List.
 In 2016 He received the Queen Elizabeth II Version of the Royal Household Long and Faithful Service Medal for 20 years of service to the British Royal Family.

References and sources
References

Sources
 Courtney, Nicholas (2004). The Queen's Stamps, The Authorised History of the Royal Philatelic Collection, éd. Methuen, 2004, .

External links 
 "In the Spotlight", interview of Sefi by Larry Rosenblum on 15 October 2004. Published in The Chronicle, journal of the Great Britain Collectors Club, January 2005. Reedited on the GBCC website, 28 May 2005, retrieved 20 December 2007.
 Sefi, Michael. "A Collector's Tale", Royal Mail website, retrieved 20 December 2007.

British philatelists
Living people
1943 births
English accountants
Fellows of the Royal Philatelic Society London
Lieutenants of the Royal Victorian Order